The  is the 12th edition of the Japan Film Professional Awards. It awarded the best of 2002 in film. The ceremony did not take place in this year.

Awards 
Best Film: Harmful Insect
Best Director: Akihiko Shiota (Harmful Insect)
Best Director: Kunitoshi Manda (Unloved)
Best Actress: Yoko Moriguchi (Unloved)
Best Actor: Gorō Kishitani (Graveyard of Honor)
Best New Director: Nami Iguchi (Inuneko)

10 best films
 Harmful Insect (Akihiko Shiota)
 KT (Junji Sakamoto)
 Blue Spring (Toshiaki Toyoda)
 Sorry (Shin Togashi)
 Graveyard of Honor (Takashi Miike)
 Unloved (Kunitoshi Manda)
 Doing Time (Yoichi Sai)
 Aiki (Daisuke Tengan)
 Yoru o Kakete (Su Jin-kim)
 The Laughing Frog (Hideyuki Hirayama)

References

External links
  

Japan Film Professional Awards
2003 in Japanese cinema
Japan Film Professional Awards